John Broward "Brad" Culpepper (born May 8, 1969) is an American former professional football player who was a defensive tackle in the National Football League (NFL) for nine seasons during the 1990s and early 2000s. Culpepper was as an All-American when he played college football for the Florida Gators. Selected late in the tenth round of the 1992 NFL Draft, he became a consistent starter for the Minnesota Vikings, Tampa Bay Buccaneers, and Chicago Bears.

Culpepper is also known for appearing on two seasons of the U.S. reality television show Survivor, appearing on Survivor: Blood vs. Water and Survivor: Game Changers.

Early life 

Culpepper was born in Tallahassee, Florida in 1969.  He attended Leon High School in Tallahassee, where he was a standout prep player for the Leon Lions high school football team.

Culpepper was born into a family of University of Florida alumni.  His father, Bruce Culpepper, was a center for the Gators football team from 1960 to 1962 and co-captain of their 1962 Gator Bowl team, and became a prominent Tallahassee attorney.  His uncle, Blair Culpepper, was a Gators fullback in 1957 and 1958, and became a bank president in Winter Park, Florida.  His grandfather, J. Broward Culpepper, was also a Florida graduate and served as the chancellor of the State University System of Florida.

College career 

Culpepper accepted an athletic scholarship to attend the University of Florida in Gainesville, Florida, where he played for coach Galen Hall and coach Steve Spurrier's Gators teams from 1988 to 1991.  During his senior season in 1991, Culpepper was a standout defensive tackle and team captain on the Gators' Southeastern Conference (SEC) championship team, a first-team All-SEC selection and a consensus first-team All-American.  He finished his college career with eighteen quarterback sacks and 47.5 tackles for a loss.  He was also named to the SEC Academic Honor Roll all four years, was a first-team Academic All-American, and received the Draddy Trophy recognizing him as college football's most outstanding student-athlete.  While Culpepper was a Florida undergraduate, he was also an active member of Sigma Chi Fraternity (Gamma Theta Chapter).

Culpepper graduated from Florida with his bachelor's degree in history after his junior year, and enrolled in a master's degree program in exercise and sports sciences during his senior football season.  After finishing his professional playing career, Culpepper returned to graduate school and law school full-time, and earned his master's degree and J.D. degree from Florida in 2001.  He was inducted into the University of Florida Athletic Hall of Fame as a "Gator Great" in 2001.  The sports editors of The Gainesville Sun ranked him as the No. 47 all-time greatest player of the first 100 seasons of the Florida Gators football team in 2006.

Professional career 

In his nine-year professional career, Culpepper played in 131 games, started 83 of them, and recorded 34 quarterback sacks and one safety.

Life after football 

Culpepper is now a trial lawyer for the Culpepper Kurland law firm in Tampa, Florida. Since his retirement, he has spoken out about his concerns regarding the increasing size of NFL players; he believes that the increasing number of  players is "unnatural and unsafe" and has led to many serious health problems.

Survivor

Blood vs. Water
Prior to his appearances, Culpepper's wife Monica was selected as a participant for the 24th season of the CBS reality television show Survivor.

Monica and Brad participated together in the show's 27th season, Survivor: Blood vs. Water. Culpepper was the sixth person eliminated from the game and came in 15th place while Monica was the season's runner-up.

On May 6, 2015, it was revealed that Culpepper was one of 16 former male players eligible to be voted onto Survivor's 31st season, Survivor: Cambodia. However, he was not voted onto it.

Game Changers

On February 8, 2017, Culpepper was revealed to be one of the contestants competing in Survivor: Game Changers, the show's 34th season, which began airing in March 2017. Throughout Culpepper's second season, he played relatively consistently, and stayed loyal to his alliances, despite being in the minority for the most part. However, at his endgame, he won five individual immunity challenges; a feat shared only by a few other elite Survivor players, which propelled him to the Final Three with Sarah Lacina and "Troyzan" Robertson. Although Culpepper played a solid social game and was a prominent threat, he became very arrogant and made some remarks toward fellow tribe mate Tai Trang that other players perceived as condescending in the last few days. Fellow tribemate Aubry Bracco in her jury speaks video controversially said she had hesitations about voting for Brad to win because of his "racist and sexist tendencies". At the Final Tribal Council, Lacina's skillful strategic and social gameplay was preferred by the jury over Culpepper's physical dominance, and she was awarded the title of "Sole Survivor" in a 7–3–0 vote. Culpepper received three votes, making him the runner-up.

Personal life 

In 1990, Culpepper met Monica Frakes when he was a sophomore at the University of Florida. The couple married weeks after Culpepper was drafted into the NFL in 1992. The couple have three children together. Their oldest son, Rex, was a quarterback at Syracuse University, and their other son, Judge, is a defensive lineman at the University of Toledo. He and his wife, Monica, are the only Survivor couple to both be runners-up in separate seasons. Coincidentally, they both achieved this feat in their second time playing the game, Monica in Survivor: Blood vs. Water and Brad in Survivor: Game Changers. This is similar to another Survivor couple, Rob Mariano and Amber Brkich, who are the only couple to both have won Survivor, Amber in Survivor: All-Stars and Rob in Survivor: Redemption Island.

See also 

 1991 College Football All-America Team
 Florida Gators football, 1990–99
 History of the Tampa Bay Buccaneers
 List of Chicago Bears players
 List of Florida Gators football All-Americans
 List of Florida Gators in the NFL Draft
 List of Levin College of Law graduates
 List of Sigma Chi members
 List of University of Florida alumni
 List of University of Florida Athletic Hall of Fame members
 Survivor: Blood vs. Water
 Survivor: Game Changers

References

Bibliography 

 Carlson, Norm, University of Florida Football Vault: The History of the Florida Gators, Whitman Publishing, LLC, Atlanta, Georgia (2007).  .
 Golenbock, Peter, Go Gators!  An Oral History of Florida's Pursuit of Gridiron Glory, Legends Publishing, LLC, St. Petersburg, Florida (2002).  .
 Hairston, Jack, Tales from the Gator Swamp: A Collection of the Greatest Gator Stories Ever Told, Sports Publishing, LLC, Champaign, Illinois (2002).  .
 McCarthy, Kevin M., Fightin' Gators: A History of University of Florida Football, Arcadia Publishing, Mount Pleasant, South Carolina (2000).  .
 Nash, Noel, ed., The Gainesville Sun Presents The Greatest Moments in Florida Gators Football, Sports Publishing, Inc., Champaign, Illinois (1998).  .

1969 births
All-American college football players
American football defensive tackles
Chicago Bears players
Florida Gators football players
Florida lawyers
Living people
Minnesota Vikings players
Players of American football from Tallahassee, Florida
Survivor (American TV series) contestants
Tampa Bay Buccaneers players
Fredric G. Levin College of Law alumni
William V. Campbell Trophy winners
Leon High School alumni